Ivan Ivanovich Martinov (the last name also spelled Martynov) (1771–1833 Saint Peterburg) was a Russian botanist and philologist.

Footnotes

Botanists active in Europe
19th-century botanists from the Russian Empire
Members of the Russian Academy
1777 births
1807 deaths
People from Poltava Oblast
People from Poltava Governorate